Ryan Simpkins (born March 25, 1998) is an American actor, known for their performances in films such as Pride and Glory, A Single Man, Revolutionary Road, and Fear Street Part Two: 1978.

Early life and education 
Simpkins was born in Manhattan, New York City, and moved to California in 2006. Their younger brother is actor Ty Simpkins. Simpkins attended UC Berkeley.

Simpkins is non-binary. As of 2021, they used they/them pronouns, but as of July 2022, their Instagram indicated they/she pronouns.

Career
Their first film appearance was in Sherrybaby, playing a lead role opposite Maggie Gyllenhaal. They have performed three times alongside brother Ty, in Pride and Glory, Revolutionary Road and Arcadia. They had a lead role as Lizzy Muldoun in the film adaptation of Wendy Mass's book Jeremy Fink and the Meaning of Life, written and directed by Tamar Halpern.

Filmography

References

External links
 

Actors from New York City
American child actors
American film actors
American television actors
Living people
People from Manhattan
21st-century American actors
American non-binary actors
1998 births